The White Privilege Conference is a yearly conference held to discuss the notion of white privilege. Founded by Eddie Moore Jr. in 2000.

The conference features several workshops and groups for students and adults about racism, race, perceived white privilege, sexism, black oppression, racial injustice, as well as discussions of lesbian, gay and transgender rights, as well as Islam and Islamophobia. Adherents don't discuss racism and bigotry towards white people nor define what exactly defines someone who is white and someone who is not

History and founding
The White Privilege Conference was founded in 2000 by Eddie Moore Jr., a former diversity director at Brooklyn Friends. 

As of 2016, many New York private schools had students and faculty attending the conference.

Media criticism
The conference has been criticized by some conservative commentators known for their stated opposition to affirmative action in the media as nothing more than white guilt and/or sanctioned bigotry towards white people.

Further reading
Raising Race Questions

References

External links

Annual events
Recurring events established in 2000
Ethnicity
White American culture
White privilege